The Columbia County School District is a school district based in Columbia County, Georgia, United States. It is run by the Columbia County Board of Education with superintendent Dr. Steven W. Flynt . CCSD currently operates a total of 32 schools: 18 elementary schools, eight middle schools, five high schools, and an alternative school.

Elementary schools
 Baker Place Elementary School
 Blue Ridge Elementary School
 Brookwood Elementary School
 Cedar Ridge Elementary School
 Euchee Creek Elementary School
 Evans Elementary School
 Greenbrier Elementary School
 Grovetown Elementary School
 Lewiston Elementary School
 Martinez Elementary School
 North Columbia Elementary School
 North Harlem Elementary School
 Parkway Elementary School
 River Ridge Elementary School
 Riverside Elementary School
 South Columbia Elementary School
 Stevens Creek Elementary School
 Westmont Elementary School

Middle schools
 Columbia Middle School
 Evans Middle School
 Greenbrier Middle School
 Grovetown Middle School
 Harlem Middle School
 Lakeside Middle School
 Riverside Middle School
 Stallings Island Middle School

High schools
 Evans High School
 Greenbrier High School
 Grovetown High School
 Harlem High School
 Lakeside High School

Alternative schools
 Columbia County Alternative School (CCAS)

References

External links

School districts in Georgia (U.S. state)
Education in Columbia County, Georgia